This is a list of science fiction and fantasy publishers, publishers of science fiction, SF studies, speculative fiction, fantasy literature, and related genres.

A
Abelard Science Fiction
Ace Books
Advent:Publishers
Aqueduct Press
Arcadia House
Arkham House
Avalon Science Fiction

B
Badger Books
Baen Books
Baen Ebooks, formerly Webscriptions
Ballantine Books
Bantam Spectra
Bent Agency
Berkley Books
Bison Books
Brick Cave Media

C
Canaveral Press
Carcosa
Carroll & Graf Publishers
Chandra Press
Cheap Street Press
Chimaera Publications
Cosmos Books

D
Dark Castle Publishing
DAW Books
Del Rey Books
Dobson Books
Donald M. Grant
Double Dragon Publishing
Dragon Moon Press

E
Editrice Nord (Italy)
Eidolon Publications
Elastic Press
Elder Signs Press
Eos Books

F
Fandemonium Books
Fantasy Press
Fantasy Publishing Company, Inc.
Fedogan & Bremer
Flame Tree Publishing

G
Gnome Press
Golden Gryphon Press
Gorgon Press
Grant-Hadley Enterprises
Greenberg
Gregg Press
Griffin Publishing Company
The Grandon Company

H
Harper Prism
HarperCollins

I
ISFiC Press

J
John Hunt Publishing
Jurassic London

K
Kayelle Press
L
 Lore Lush Publishing
M
Mark V. Ziesing
Megara Publishing
Meisha Merlin Publishing
Mojo Press

N
N.F.F.F.
Necronomicon Press
Necropolitan Press
NESFA Press
New Arc Books
New Collector's Group
New Era
Newcastle Publishing Company
Night Shade Books
Norilana Books

O
Orb Books
Orb Publications
Orbit Books

P
Palliard Press
Panther Books
Parvus Press
Phantasia Press
Phoenix Pick
Prime Books
Prime Press
PS Publishing
Pulphouse Publishing
Pyr

R
Rainfall Books
Return From Earth Publications

S
Severed Press
Shasta Publishers
Silver Key Press
Small Beer Press
Sphere Books
St. Martin's Press
Subterranean Press

T
Tachyon Publications
The Women's Press
Ticonderoga Publications
Timescape Books
Tor Books
Twayne

U
Underwood-Miller

V
Vela Press
Victor Gollancz Ltd

W
Wheatland Press
Wildside Press
Winston Science Fiction

References